"Little Things" is the debut single from Good Charlotte's self-titled debut album, released in mid 2000.

The song was re-released in the UK on March 9, 2009. This song is featured in the 2000 film, Dude, Where's My Car?.

The song was also featured in the game Project Gotham Racing.

Track listing
"Little Things" - 3:24
"The Click" - 3:36
"Thank You Mom" - 3:53

Music video
The music video shows the band performing in a high school. It was directed by Nigel Dick and was filmed between July 17 and 18, 2000 at Lorne Park Secondary School in Mississauga, Ontario, Canada.  The Recording Session in the film dance was released on January 12, 2000.  Mandy Moore appears in this video.

Charts

References

External links
 Little Things on Sony Musicbox
 

2001 debut singles
Good Charlotte songs
Songs written by Benji Madden
Songs written by Joel Madden
Songs about school
Music videos directed by Nigel Dick
2000 songs
Epic Records singles